Terminal Romance is the fourth album by Canadian rocker Matt Mays, and his second with backing band El Torpedo, following 2005's Matt Mays & El Torpedo. The album was released on July 8, 2008. Singles, "Tall Trees" and "Building a Boat" received heavy airplay on Canadian radio, including CBC Radio 3.

This album was the last that Mays recorded with El Torpedo, as they officially disbanded in June 2009 with the departure of Andy Patil (bass & vocals) and Tim Baker (drums). However, Adam Baldwin (keyboard) and Jay Smith (guitar & vocals) have remained with Mays. The band added three new members, including drummer Damien Moynihan and former The Guthries members Serge Samson and Dale Murray. In addition to playing in The Guthries, Murray has played guitar and pedal steel on each previous Matt Mays album.

Throughout July 2008, Matt Mays and El Torpedo toured with Kid Rock in support of their new album. On December 12, 2008 Matt Mays & El Torpedo received 5 East Coast Music Association Nominations including Group Recording Of The Year and Songwriter Of The Year.

Track listing

2008 albums
Matt Mays albums
Albums produced by Chris Tsangarides